Bada Kabarastan, also written as "Bara Qabristan", is a Muslim cemetery in the Marine Lines area of south Mumbai in India. One of the largest Muslim cemeteries in the country, it is also the final resting place of a number of icons from the Indian film industry.

Bada Kabarastan is bordered by the Chandanwadi Hindu crematorium and a cemetery.

The land was purchased and dedicated to the Muslim Community by Konkani Muslim business man of Mumbai Nakhuda Mohammad Ali Roghay. The land comprises two land one each purchased from Mrs.Woomabay widow of Shamsheth for the sum of RS. 26,620/00 on 8 August 1829 and another from Shapoorjee Sorqbhjhee on 28 June 1832 for the sum of 32,251/00.

Notable interments 
 Mehboob Khan (1907–1964), film director
 Meeraji (1912–1949),  Urdu poet
 Yakub Memon (1962–2015),
 Ismail Merchant (1936–2005), TV and film producer
 Nargis (1929–1981), actress
 Shyama (1935–2017), actress
 Suraiya (1929–2004), actress

References

External links 
 The old resting places of the beautiful 

Buildings and structures in Mumbai
Cemeteries in India
Islam in Mumbai
1829 establishments in India
Cemeteries established in the 1820s